The Gonzaga–Saint Mary's men's basketball rivalry is an intra-West Coast Conference college basketball rivalry between the Saint Mary's Gaels men's basketball team of Saint Mary's College of California in Moraga, California and the Gonzaga Bulldogs men's basketball team of Gonzaga University in Spokane, Washington. Many analysts and members of the media have touted the Gaels vs. Zags as one of the best, if not the best, college basketball rivalry on the West Coast, as both teams have been consistently two of the top three teams in the conference over the last 2 decades. Gonzaga and Saint Mary's have combined to win 20 out of the last 24 conference championship games, including each of the last 14. The two teams have met a total of 112 times dating back to 1955 and currently meet biannually as a part of WCC conference play, with the potential to play a third game in the WCC tournament and a fourth in the postseason. As of March 2022, they have met 20 times in the WCC Tournament but have never met in any postseason tournaments beyond the end of conference play. Saint Mary's has upset a number 1 ranked Zags squad twice – once in the 2019 WCC final as an unranked team and once in 2022 as #23 in Moraga.

Game results 
Below is a complete list of series results, according to Sports Reference and GoZags.com.

References 

College basketball rivalries in the United States
Gonzaga Bulldogs men's basketball
Saint Mary's Gaels men's basketball